This is a list of stunt performers nicknamed by themselves or others as the "Human Fly."

 Harry Gardiner
 "Steeplejack" Charles Miller
 George Polley
 Henry Roland
 John Ciampa
 George Willig

References

Urban climbers
Stunt
Human Fly